During the 1994–95 English football season, Ipswich Town competed in the FA Premier League.

Season summary
Ipswich Town conceded 93 Premier League goals, kept just 3 clean sheets and recorded just 7 wins all season as one of the worst seasons in their history saw them return to the second tier of the league after three seasons in the top flight.

Manager John Lyall reverted to manager after being Director of Football for the previous season and during the summer, Steve Sedgley became the club's first £1 million signing. However, Ipswich experienced their worst start to a season for 31 years, losing 11 of their first 15 games. Following defeat by Manchester City at the beginning of December with Ipswich bottom of the league and relegation already looking more than likely, Lyall quit. Coach Paul Goddard stepped in as caretaker manager but former player George Burley was soon back at the club as manager, with Dale Roberts as his assistant. But the transition did little to alter Ipswich's fortunes. Before then though, in arguably their biggest highlight of the season, the Tractor Boys stunned reigning champions Manchester United by beating them 3–2 at Portman Road in September (having even led by 2–0 at one stage) which would ultimately be one of the defeats that cost United the title by one point. However, in the return fixture, an unthinkable double wasn't to be and a 9–0 humiliation at the hands of United at Old Trafford in early March, a record Premier League defeat, effectively crushed any remaining hopes of survival. The defeat was part of a run of seven defeats with Ipswich failing to score and their relegation was guaranteed on 14 April with six games remaining following results elsewhere. On a brighter note though, another highlight included a surprise 1–0 win at Anfield against eventual-4th-placed Liverpool in mid-January, their first win at Anfield in 34 attempts.

In the cups, Ipswich failed to progress in both, losing to First Division Bolton in the Coca Cola Cup and to Second Division Wrexham in the FA Cup.

With an ageing squad, Burley was given little option but to resort to his young reserves in hope of rebuilding his side ready to push for a Premier League comeback.

Former chairman Patrick Cobbold died in December.

First-team squad
Squad at end of season

Left club during season

Reserve squad

Competitions

FA Premier League

League table

Results summary

Results by round

Legend

Ipswich Town's score comes first

Matches

FA Cup

League Cup

Transfers

Transfers in

Loans in

Transfers out

Loans out

Awards

Player awards

References

Ipswich Town F.C. seasons
Ipswich Town